Portland Timbers may refer to any of four distinct professional soccer teams:
Portland Timbers, a Major League Soccer (MLS) expansion team that began playing in 2011.
Portland Timbers 2, the MLS team's top reserve side that plays in USL Pro.
Portland Timbers U23s, a developmental squad for the MLS team that plays in the USL Premier Development League.
Portland Timbers (1975–82), the original top-flight team that played in the North American Soccer League from 1975 to 1982.
Portland Timbers (1985–90), the semi-pro team that played in the Western Alliance Challenge Series, Western Soccer Alliance, Western Soccer League and American Professional Soccer League from 1985 to 1990.
Portland Timbers (2001–10), the second division team that played in the A-League, USL First Division and USSF Division-2 Professional League from 2001 to 2010.

See also